Wayne Gould (高樂德) (born 3 July 1945 in Hawera, New Zealand) is a retired Hong Kong judge, most recently known for helping to popularise sudoku puzzles in the United Kingdom, and thereafter in the United States.

He pioneered the global success and popularity of the Sudoku puzzle outside Japan where it had been popular for many years. Gould worked as a judge in the criminal courts of Hong Kong. In 1997 he found a sudoku book in a bookstore in Tokyo. Gould then spent 6 years developing a computer program, known as Pappocom Sudoku, that could mass-produce puzzles for the global market. In November 2004 the London Times was convinced to publish the puzzles. His work led to the publication of sudoku puzzles in many UK newspapers.

Part of his strategy in the U.S. market was offering newspapers a daily puzzle at no charge, unique to each paper, for publication accompanied by an offer of its solution via the Pappocom website. The website also offered those consulting it a low-cost program that generates and, if desired, assists in solving, unlimited Sudoku puzzles of a difficulty and style specified by the user.

He is also editor of several paperback collections of the puzzles called Su Doku: The Utterly Addictive Number-placing Puzzle, published in 2005 by The Times Books.

He was named one of the 'World's Most Influential People' of 2006 by Time magazine.
He is the brother of the former British politician Bryan Gould.

See also 

 Howard Garns

References

External links 

 Profile of Wayne Gould
 Wayne Gould Sudoku page

 

1945 births
Living people
New Zealand judges on the courts of Hong Kong
Video game programmers
New Zealand emigrants to Hong Kong
People from Hāwera